Brooks Creek may refer to:

Brooks Creek (Indiana), a stream in Indiana
Brooks Creek (Missouri), a stream in Missouri
Brooks Creek (Haw River tributary), a stream in North Carolina